Mher Avanesyan ; born 28 July 1974) is an Armenian professional footballer.

External links
 
 

1974 births
Living people
Armenian footballers
Expatriate footballers in Iran
Armenian expatriate footballers
FC Ararat Yerevan players
Bargh Shiraz players
FC Shirak players
Armenian Premier League players
Persian Gulf Pro League players
Association football forwards